The 1910 Australian referendum was held on 13 April 1910, in conjunction with the 1910 federal election. It contained two referendum questions.
__NoTOC__

Results in detail

State Debts
This section is an excerpt from 1910 Australian referendum (State Debts) § Referendum results

Surplus Revenue
This section is an excerpt from 1910 Australian referendum (Surplus Revenue) § Referendum results

See also
Referendums in Australia
Politics of Australia
History of Australia

References

Further reading
  
 .
 Australian Electoral Commission (2007) Referendum Dates and Results 1906 – Present AEC, Canberra.

1910 referendums
1910
Plebiscite
April 1910 events